Hilarographa cymatodes is a species of moth of the family Tortricidae. It is found on Sumba Island in eastern Indonesia.

References

Moths described in 1983
Hilarographini